Hebbala is an locality in Bengaluru, Karnataka, India, which was once indicative of the north endpoint of the city. Though originally famous for Hebbal Lake, it is now better known for the serpentine maze of flyovers that network the Outer Ring Road and Airport Road on NH 44. The flyover was built by Gammon India. The lake area in Hebbala is well-known for its picnic spots, a well-maintained park, boating facilities and for the bird watching opportunities. 

Hebbala used to be the end of the municipal corporation limits. One can still see the milestone between the Baptist hospital and checkpost. Bengaluru has now grown quite a bit towards north, beyond these marks. L&T factory, which was established in the 1970s, is also close to Hebbala. GKVK University and Manyata Tech Park with a number of office buildings and commercial enterprises makes Hebbala an attractive investment spot.

History 
Historians have suggested that the vicinity of Hebbal Lake to the area has made Hebbala possibly one of the oldest inhabited areas in Bengaluru. An inscription stone dating back to 750 AD was found near Maaramma temple in Hebbala which describes what may be the first-named Bengalurean, Kittayya. The stone describes an attack by Rashtrakuta raiders against whom he defended  Perbolal, a name that morphed into Hebbal over the years.  Historian B N Sundar Rao in his seminal work ‘Bengaluru Itihasa’, has also theorized that Kempegowda borrowed the name Bengaluru from a hamlet to the northwest of Hebbal Lake.

Transport

Roads
All arterial roads and road networks leading to the Kempegowda International Airport intersect at Hebbala. Further, BIAL has its office on the National Highway (NH 44) exit of the Hebbala flyover in Gayathri Lake Front. Due to short-sightedness of the governing authorities, the Hebbala Flyover has become a bottle-neck for traffic flow from the city centre towards North and the same when traveling from North to city centre. Traffic is crawling be it any time of the day. This is because almost 6 lanes coming from each side, jostle to fit in the two lane Hebbala bridge bringing the traffic to a stand still.

Buses
The area is well connected by BMTC buses. From Hebbal, you can get the city bus for almost all places in Bengaluru. Hebbala is also a common point if you are traveling to/from the airport. Hebbala also has a small railway station.

References

Neighbourhoods in Bangalore